was a Japanese daimyō of the Sengoku period and early Edo period.  He was the head of Numazu Domain in Suruga Province.

Tadasuke was established at Numazu in 1601.  When he died in 1613, he left no heir; and the domain reverted to the Tokugawa shogunate.

References

External links
"Numazu" at Edo 300 

Daimyo
1537 births
1613 deaths
Ōkubo clan
Place of birth unknown
Place of death unknown
Date of birth unknown